Oskar Sunnefeldt (born 21 April 1998) is a Swedish handball player who plays for SC DHfK Leipzig.

He represented Sweden at the 2021 World Men's Handball Championship in Egypt.

References

1998 births
Living people
Swedish male handball players
Handball players at the 2020 Summer Olympics
Olympic handball players of Sweden